Ian Charles Cooper (2 April 1946 – 14 December 2021) was a former Australian rules footballer who played for St Kilda in the Victorian Football League during the 1960s. In a retrospective poll by a team of experts, Cooper was voted best on the field in the 1966 VFL Grand Final, which St Kilda won. It was St Kilda's first and (as of 2020) only VFL/AFL premiership by a margin of one point over Collingwood.

Cooper's VFL career was cut short by rheumatic fever. In 1970 and 1971, Cooper played for Swan Districts in the West Australian National Football League, and was a Western Australian state representative player. In 1972, he returned to Victoria and became a prominent full forward with the Sandringham Football Club in the Victorian Football Association, where he played 35 games and kicked 73 goals. In 1973, he kicked 104 goals to be the VFA Division 1 leading goalkicker for the home-and-away season, although he was passed in the finals by Jim 'Frosty' Miller. Altogether, Cooper played 56 games for Sandringham between 1972 and 1975, and kicked 282 goals.

His older brother Graham played for Hawthorn in the early 1960s, appearing in that club's first premiership team.

References

External links

1946 births
2021 deaths
Australian rules footballers from Victoria (Australia)
St Kilda Football Club players
St Kilda Football Club Premiership players
Sandringham Football Club players
Swan Districts Football Club players
One-time VFL/AFL Premiership players